The third and final season of La Voz Senior began airing on January 8, 2022 on Antena 3. Antonio Orozco and David Bustamante return as coaches from the previous season. Niña Pastori and José Mercé were announced as new coaches, replacing Pastora Soler, and Rosana Arbelo. Eva González remains as the host of the program. 

Gwen Perry won the season, marking David Bustamante's second and final win as a coach.

Coaches 
It was announced that Antonio Orozco and David Bustamante are the returning coaches from the previous season of the show. Meanwhile, they are joined by newcomers Niña Pastori and last season's guest coach, José Mercé.

Teams 
  Winner
  Runner-up
  Third place
  Fourth place
  Eliminated in the Finale
  Eliminated in the Knockouts

Blind Auditions

Episode 1 (8 January 2022)

Episode 2 (15 January 2022)

The Knockouts 
In the Knockouts, also labeled as "The Semifinal", each coach had all their artists compete in a knockout. At the end of all performances, the audience voted for one artist per team to advance, while each coach chose a second artist, both advancing into the Finale. Coaches received help from their advisors: Shaila Dúrcal for Team Bustamante, Kiki Morente for Team Pastori, Omar Montes for Team Mercé, and Tomatito for Team Antonio.

Elimination chart

Color key 

  Team Bustamante
  Team Pastori
  Team Mercé
  Team Antonio
  Winner
  Runner-up
  Third place
  Fourth place
  Eliminated

Table

References 

Spanish television series
2021 Spanish television seasons
Spain